California Halt was a railway station on the Midland and Great Northern Joint Railway which served the Norfolk village of California, England.

History

Opened by the Midland and Great Northern Joint Railway, the station was closed as a wartime measure before passing briefly to the Eastern Region of British Railways on nationalisation in 1948 only to be closed by the British Railways in 1959.

References

 
 
 

Disused railway stations in Norfolk
Former Midland and Great Northern Joint Railway stations
Railway stations in Great Britain opened in 1933
Railway stations in Great Britain closed in 1939
Railway stations in Great Britain opened in 1948
Railway stations in Great Britain closed in 1959